Pinky is an albino bottlenose dolphin found in Calcasieu Lake, Louisiana. Pinky was first spotted in June 2007 by a boat captain, Erik Rue. In 2015, Rue was able to capture photo evidence of Pinky mating, proving that she is female. The dolphin has become a tourist attraction, and conservationists have asked visitors to leave the dolphin alone. Pinky's behavior is similar to the rest of the dolphins in her pod, although she tends to spend more time underwater.

The animal's popular name is derived from where it frequently lives as well as its skin hue.

Coloring 
Although it is quite rare to see an albino animal in the wild, Pinky has a few signs that appear to confirm her albinism. Blood vessels and eyes with a reddish hue can be seen through Pinky's skin, a key indicator that the cells that normally make the pigment melanin, are hardly active in this dolphin's body. Although albinism can be hereditary, it is unknown if Pinky's parents were of a pinkish/white hue or if they simply carried this specific gene mutation which they then passed down to Pinky.

In 2017, a video was taken showing two albino dolphins swimming in the lake, presumed to be Pinky and her calf.

See also
 List of individual cetaceans

References

Individual albino animals
Individual dolphins
Individual animals in the United States
About the Author AZ Animals Staff AZ Animals is a growing team of animals experts, Author, A., Staff, A., & AZ Animals is a growing team of animals experts. (2022, August 12). Amazon River Dolphin (pink dolphin). Retrieved October 28, 2022, from https://a-z-animals.com/animals/pink-dolphin/